Diana Hayden (born 1 May 1973) is an Indian actress, television host, model and the winner of Miss World 1997 pageant. She is the third Indian woman to win the title of Miss World. She also won three subtitles during the pageant and is the only Miss World titleholder to do so. In 2008, she was a celebrity contestant in the reality show Bigg Boss.

Early life
Hayden was born in Hyderabad, Andhra Pradesh, India, in an Anglo-Indian Christian family. She attended St. Ann's High School in Secunderabad. Her parents separated when she was in school and she had to start working at the age of 13. She worked for an event management company called Encore, during when she began taking up modelling assignments. At the age of 21, she worked as a Public Relations Officer at BMG Crescendo, where she assisted in managing the careers of singers Anaida and Mehnaz Hoosein.

Pageantry
Hayden's journey in pageantry began at the age of 23, when a friend recommended her to enter Femina Miss India. She was then shortlisted for the Femina Miss India 1997 contest. She finished second place and earned the title of Miss India World. She represented India at the 47th edition of the Miss World pageant held in Baie Lazare, Seychelles. A total of 86 delegates competed for the title and at the end of the event, Hayden was crowned as Miss World 1997.

During the question and answer segment of the competition, Hayden responded to the question - "Why do you want to become Miss World?", by stating: 
"I draw inspiration from a famous writer and poet, William Butler Yeats, who once wrote - 'With Dreams Begin Responsibility.' Well for me, this title is that dream and the responsibility it brings, I cherish that in a small way I could make a difference and help the dreams of others. Thank you."

Hayden was also crowned as the "Miss World - Asia and Oceania" during the Miss World contest. In addition, she won the titles Miss Photogenic and Spectacular Swimwear. Hayden is the only Miss World titleholder to win three subtitles during the competition. She is the third Indian woman to win the Miss World pageant, after Reita Faria in 1966 and Aishwarya Rai Bachchan in 1994.

After her win at Miss World, she was signed up to endorse L'Oréal, Colgate and Chopard in India. She has been associated with various charities including Child Rights and You (CRY), Greenpeace, PETA and the Spastics Society of India. She has supported several causes to spread awareness about cancer and HIV/AIDS.

Career
Following her tenure as the Miss World organization's global representative, Hayden moved to London and studied acting at the Royal Academy of Dramatic Art. She also studied at the Drama Studio London, where she concentrated on the works of Shakespeare and earned a Best Actress nomination from the studio. In 2001, she made her screen debut in the film version of Shakespeare's Othello in South Africa.

She hosted Miss Europe twice in 2001 and 2002 in Lebanon, along with Miss Lebanon 1997 and Julien Lepers.
Diana was signed by the Avalon Academy in 2006 as the face of the Academy and currently serves as a celebrity Guest Lecturer for airline personnel training programmes.

In 2008, Diana Hayden became a wild card entry on the second season of the Indian TV show Bigg Boss. She was voted off Bigg Boss during Week 13.

She has written a book called A Beautiful Truth which is an "encyclopedia on grooming and also deals with personality development and confidence building". She took two years to complete the book, which was released on 6 August 2012.

Personal life
Hayden is married to Collin Dick, an American businessman from Nevada. He had been working in Mumbai for an international NGO. In an interview, Hayden had stated that she met Dick when he came as a prospective tenant to rent her apartment. They got married in a private ceremony which was attended by their family and close friends, on 13 September 2013. The wedding took place in a country club in Las Vegas.

In 2016, she gave birth to a girl. The child was born from an egg that Hayden had frozen 8 years previously. In November 2017, Hayden confirmed that she was pregnant for the second time. In March 2018, she gave birth to twins, a boy and a girl.

Controversy
In 2018, Biplab Kumar Deb, the Chief Minister of Tripura state made a controversial statement regarding Hayden during a public speech. Deb questioned the rationale behind crowning Diana Hayden as Miss World in 1997 and claimed that all international beauty pageants were a farce. Deb expressed - "Tell me, did she [Diana] deserve it? People might say I am creating a controversy. I can understand Aishwarya Rai getting it, at least she has traits of an Indian beauty." Deb went on to add that "for Indians, Goddess Lakshmi and Saraswati exemplify beauty. I don't understand the beauty of Diana Hayden."

Deb's remarks received massive backlash from netizens and social activists. Hayden responded to Deb's comments by stating:

Deb later expressed regret and apologized for his remarks on Hayden.

Filmography

Films

Television

See also
 Reita Faria
 Yukta Mookhey
 Manushi Chhillar

References

External links
 

1973 births
Femina Miss India winners
Anglo-Indian people
Indian Christians
Indian beauty pageant winners
Indian film actresses
Living people
Miss World winners
Miss World 1997 delegates
Actresses from Hyderabad, India
Actresses of European descent in Indian films
Alumni of the Drama Studio London
Beauty pageant contestants from India
Female models from Hyderabad, India
Bigg Boss (Hindi TV series) contestants